Leslie Ernest Dayman (born 19 January 1938) credited variously as Les Dayman and Les Daymen, is an Australian retired actor best known for his performances on television (serials and telemovies) and film, major small screen roles including Homicide, Prisoner, Sons and Daughters and E Street. As

Career

Theatre

Dayman was born in Footscray, Victoria, Australia in January 1938 and is the son of AFL/VFL footballer Les Dayman. He started a career in theatre in 1955, and thereafter worked as an actor, director and narrator,

Television

A staple of the small screen, his  television career began in 1964, when he appeared in the police procedural crime series Homicide. As senior detective Bill Hudson he appeared in 104 episodes from 1966 to 1968. 

In the 1980s, he was a regular cast member in three major Australian soap operas, all of which had international success: in Grundy Television's Sons and Daughters, he played Roger Carlyle, a ruthless shady businessman in episodes broadcast in 1984 and 1985; also in 1985, he starred in Prisoner, another Grundy production, as Geoff MacRae, one of three male prisoners in a 6 month story arc, and in E Street, he played Senior Sergeant George Sullivan for the series entire run from 1989 to 1993.

Other television appearances have included Division 4, Bellamy, Cop Shop, Holiday Island, A Country Practice, Water Rats, Stingers, All Saints, Miss Fisher's Murder Mysteries and Sara Dane. Movie appearances include Weekend of Shadows, Gallipoli, Oscar and Lucinda, Footy Legends, Stepfather of the Bride, The Silence and Holy Smoke! He acted in many South Australian Theatre Company productions and was its director from 1968 to 1969.

Personal life 

He has two sons with Diane Chamberlain Dayman (also an actor and member of the South Australian Theatre Company): Nicholas Andrew and Timothy Paul. Dayman now has two granddaughters and a grandson.

Les is currently married to wife Rose Dayman. since 1961

Filmography

Television and film roles

References

External links 
 

20th-century Australian male actors
21st-century Australian male actors
Australian male film actors
Australian male soap opera actors
Australian male stage actors
1938 births
Living people
Male actors from Melbourne
People from Footscray, Victoria